Holy Trinity High School is a private, Roman Catholic high school in Winsted, Minnesota, United States. It is located in the Roman Catholic Diocese of New Ulm.

Background 
Holy Trinity High School is part of the Holy Trinity Parish and School, which offers Catholic education from pre-kindergarten through 12th grade.

External links

Notes and references 

Roman Catholic Diocese of New Ulm
Catholic secondary schools in Minnesota
Schools in McLeod County, Minnesota
Educational institutions established in 1883
1883 establishments in Minnesota
Private middle schools in Minnesota
Private elementary schools in Minnesota